Philipp Franz Wilhelm von Zwackh-Holzhausen (1826 – 1903) was a German botanist and mycologist.

References

1826 births
1903 deaths
German botanists
German mycologists